Valerie Welsh (born April 14, 1988) was a Canadian synchronized swimmer.

Career
Welsh won a gold at the 2011 Pan American Games in the team event. She competed in the women's team event at the 2012 Summer Olympics, finishing fourth. Welsh retired from synchronized swimming after the 2012 Olympics.

References 

1988 births
Living people
Canadian synchronized swimmers
Olympic synchronized swimmers of Canada
Synchronized swimmers at the 2012 Summer Olympics
World Aquatics Championships medalists in synchronised swimming
Synchronized swimmers at the 2011 World Aquatics Championships
Synchronized swimmers at the 2009 World Aquatics Championships
Synchronized swimmers at the 2011 Pan American Games
Pan American Games gold medalists for Canada
Pan American Games medalists in synchronized swimming
Medalists at the 2011 Pan American Games
20th-century Canadian women
21st-century Canadian women